A river valley civilization is an agricultural nation or civilization situated beside and drawing sustenance from a river. A "civilization" means a society with large permanent settlements featuring urban development, social stratification, specialization of labour, centralized organization, and written or other formal means of communication. A river gives the inhabitants a reliable source of water for drinking and agriculture. Additional benefits include fishing, fertile soil due to annual flooding, and ease of transportation. The first great civilizations, such as those in Mesopotamia and Ancient Egypt, all grew up in river valleys. Mesopotamian civilization flourished near the Tigris River and the civilization of Egypt flourished near the river Nile.

Overview
The Uruk period of Mesopotamia dates from about 4000 to 3100 BCE and provides the earliest signs of the existence of states in the Near East. Located along the Tigris and Euphrates rivers in the Middle East, the name given to that civilization, Mesopotamia, means "between rivers". The Nile valley in Egypt had been home to agricultural settlements as early as 5500 BCE, but the growth of Ancient Egypt as a civilization began around 3100 BCE. A third civilization grew up along the Indus River around 3300 BCE in parts of what is now India and Pakistan (see Bronze Age India). The fourth great river civilization emerged around 1700 BCE along the Yellow River in China.

Civilizations tended to grow up in river valleys for a number of reasons. The most obvious is access to a usually reliable source of water for agriculture and other needs. Plentiful water and the enrichment of the soil due to annual floods made it possible to grow excess crops beyond what was needed to sustain an agricultural village. This allowed for some members of the community to engage in non-agricultural activities, such as the construction of buildings and cities (the root of the word "civilization"), metalworking, trade, and social organization. Boats on the river provided an easy and efficient way to transport people and goods, allowing for the development of trade and facilitating central control of outlying areas.

History

Early civilizations

Fertile Crescent

Mesopotamia
Mesopotamia was one of the earliest river valley civilizations, starting to form around 4000 BCE. The civilization was created after regular trading started relationships between multiple cities and states around the Tigris and Euphrates Rivers. Mesopotamian cities became self-run civil governments. One of the cities within this civilization, Ur, was the first literate society in history. Eventually, they constructed irrigation systems to exploit the two rivers, transforming their dry land into an agriculturally productive area, allowing population growth throughout the cities and states within Mesopotamia.

Egypt
Ancient Egypt also created irrigation systems from its local river, the Nile River, more complex than previous systems. The Egyptians would rotate legumes with cereal, which would stop salt buildup from the freshwater and enhance the fertility of their fields. The Nile River also allowed easier travel, eventually resulting in the creation of two kingdoms in the north and south areas of the river until both were unified into one society by 3000 BCE.

Indus valley 
Much of the history of the Indus valley civilization is unknown. Discovered in the 1920s, Harappan society remains a mystery because the Harappan system of writing has not yet been deciphered. It was larger than either Egypt or Mesopotamia. Historians have found no evidence of violence or a ruling class; there are no distinctive burial sites, and there is not a lot of evidence to suggest a formal military. However, historians believe that the lack of knowledge about the ruling class and the military is mainly due to the inability to read Harappan writing.

Yellow River
The Yellow River became settled in 9500 BCE. Many tribes settled along the river, sixth-longest in the world, which was distinguished by its heavy load of yellow silt and its periodic devastating floods. A major impetus for the tribes to unite into a single kingdom by around 1700 BCE (Erlitou culture, a Yellow River civilization) was the desire to find a solution to the frequent deadly floods. The Yellow River is often called "The Cradle of Chinese Civilization".

Supe Valley

Urubamba River Valley
Inca Empire

See also
Hydraulic empire
Ancient Egypt
Mesopotamia
Meluha

References

Sources

Further reading
Clayton, Peter A. & Dent, John (1973). The Ancient River Civilizations: Western Man & the Modern World. Elsevier. 

Agriculture by type
Bronze Age civilizations